The Muringamangalam Sreemahadevar Temple, located a 1/2 km from Konni Junction, is more than 1000 years old.  It used to belong to the Pandalam Royal Family. It is the biggest temple east of Pathanamthitta and the biggest Siva temple in Pathanamthitta District. The main deity is Lord Shiva, facing east. Lords Ganapathi, Ayyappa, Nagas and Krishna are installed here. The temple of Lord Krishna is a recent addition, as it was after his presence was found in 'Devaprasnam', due to continuous Bhagavatha Sapthaham.

Hindu temples in Pathanamthitta district